Ironpot may refer to:

 Ironpot, Queensland (Livingstone Shire), a locality in Queensland, Australia
 Ironpot, Queensland (South Burnett Region), a locality in Queensland, Australia